Harry H. Gring (January 18, 1918 – August 7, 1992) was a former Republican member of the Pennsylvania House of Representatives.

References

Republican Party members of the Pennsylvania House of Representatives
1918 births
1992 deaths
20th-century American politicians